The following local races were on the ballot in Washington State during the 2006 election.  The filing period for candidates for public office was July 24 through July 28, 2006. Washington State's primary election was held on September 19, 2006.

County & Local Elections

Adams County
County Commissioner District 3
Jeffrey W. Stevens (R)

County Assessor
David Anderson (R)

County Auditor
Nancy McBroom (R)

County Clerk
Paulette Gibler (R)

Othello District Court Judge
Gary Brueher (NP)

County Prosecutor
Randy Flyckt (R)

County Sheriff
Douglas Barger (R)

County Treasurer
Laura Danekas (R)

Asotin County

City Council

City of Asotin

City of Asotin Council Pos 3 	
Vickie Bonfield (NP) 	

City of Asotin Council Pos 4 	
Marvin A. Schneider (NP) 	

City of Asotin Council Pos 5 	
Del Schnider (NP) 	

City of Clarkston

City of Clarkston Council Pos 1 	
Dave Richards (NP) 	

City of Clarkston Council Pos 2 	
John Smith (NP) 	

City of Clarkston Council Pos 3 	
Larry Baumberger (NP) 	

City of Clarkston Council Pos 4 	
Terry Beadles (NP) 	

City of Clarkston Council Pos 5 	
Kathy Renggli (NP)

Fire Districts

Asotin County Fire Protection District No. 1

Fire Protection District No. 1 Comm Pos 2 	
Patrick Loseth (NP)

Port Districts

Port of Clarkston

Port Commissioner Dist 1 	
Don Hillis (NP)

School Districts

Clarkston School District No. 250-185

Clarkston School Dist Director Dist 2 	
Nancy Randall (NP) 	

Clarkston School Dist Director Dist 3 	
Lloyd Wallis (NP) 	

Clarkston School Dist Director Dist 4 	
Judy Rooney (NP) 	

Clarkston School Dist Director Dist 5 	
Dennis Lentz (NP) 	

Asotin-Anatone School District No. 420

Asotin-Anatone School Director Dist 2 	
Chris Loseth (NP) 	

Asotin-Anatone School Director Dist 3 	
Lorine Utmor (NP) 	
		  	
Asotin-Anatone School Director Dist 4 	
Kenneth Weiss (NP)

Benton County

Benton County Assessor
Carolyn Kathleen Joyce (R)
Barbara Wagner (R)

Benton County Auditor 
Bobbie Gagner (R)

Benton County Clerk 
Byron Pugh (R)
Josie Delvin (R)

Benton County Coroner
John Hansens (R)
Rick Corson (R)
Kimberly Kennedy (D)
Mark A. Cope (D)

Benton County Prosecuting Attorney
Andy Miller (D)

Benton County Sheriff 
Larry D. Taylor (R)

Benton County Treasurer 
Duane A. Davidson (R)

Chelan County

Chelan County Commissioners

District 2 
Keith Goehner (R)

Public Utility District Commissioners

District 2 
Bob Boyd
District B At-Large 
Gary Montague

Chelan County Assessor
Russ Griffith

Chelan County Auditor 
Evely L. Arnold

Chelan County Clerk 
Siri Woods

Chelan County Coroner 
Wayne Harris

Chelan County Pros. Attorney 
Gary Riesen

Chelan County Sheriff 
Mike Harum

Chelan County Treasurer 
David E. Griffiths

District Court Judge A 
Alicia Nakata

District Court Judge B 
Nancy Harmon

Clallam County
Assessor
Auditor
Treasurer
Pros. Atty
Sheriff
Director of DCD
Dist. Court 1 Judge
Dist. Court 2 Judge
County Commissioner Dist. 3
Mike Doherty (D) - Incumbent
PUD Commissioner Dist. 3
5 Charter Review Commissioners from each Commissioner Dist.

Clark County

Columbia County

Cowlitz County
County Assessor
Terry McLaughlin (D) - Incumbent

County Auditor
Kristina K. Swanson (D) - Incumbent

County Clerk
Roni A. Booth (D) - Incumbent

County Commissioner District 3
Jeff Rasmussen (R) - Incumbent
Axel Swanson (D) (GENERAL ELECTION WINNER)
The following candidates for County Commissioner lost the primary.
Ken Spring (R) 
Chuck Wallace (D) 
Elizabeth (Beth) J. Webb (D)

County Coroner
Timothy J. Davidson (D) - Incumbent

County Prosecuting Attorney
Sue Baur (D) - Incumbent

County Sheriff
Bill Mahoney (D) - Incumbent

County Treasurer
Judy 'Lyons' Ainslie (R) - Incumbent

Cowlitz County District Court
Judge Position 1
David R. Koss (NP) - Incumbent
Judge Position 2
Edward J. Putka (NP) - Incumbent

Cowlitz Public Utility District
Commissioner District 2
Mark McCrady (NP) (GENERAL ELECTION WINNER)
John Searing (NP) - (Incumbent) (Searing was a primary winner but withdrew from the race on October 2. His name was on the general election ballot.  Had John Searing received the most votes, Searing would have declined another six years as PUD Commissioner, and a person other than Mark McCrady would have been appointed.)
Howard Meharg (NP) (lost primary)

Douglas County

Ferry County

Franklin County

Garfield County

Grant County

Grays Harbor County

Island County
Place data here please

Jefferson County

King County

King County Prosecutor Norm Maleng, R
Seattle City Council, Seat 9 - Sally Clark, NP

Kitsap County
County Commissioner District 3
Patricia Lent (R)

County Assessor
Jim Avery (R)

County Auditor
Karen Flynn (D)

County Clerk
Dave Peterson (D)

County Coroner
Greg Sandstrom (R)

County Prosecuting Attorney
Russ Hauge (D)

County Sheriff
Steve Boyer (D)

County Treasurer
Barbara Stephenson (D)

District Court Judge Department 1
James Riehl (NP)

District Court Judge Department 2
W. Daniel Phillips (NP)

District Court Judge Department 3
Marilyn Paja (NP)

Kittitas County
County Assessor
Iris Rominger

County Auditor
Jerald Pettit

County Clerk
Joyce Julsrud

County Commissioner District 3
Perry Huston (R) - Incumbent, running for Sheriff in '06
Fennelle Miller (D)
Website: https://web.archive.org/web/20130612143757/http://miller4kittitas.com/
Dale Hubbard (D)
Mark McClain (R)

District Court Judge 	  	 
Lower County
Tom Haven
Upper County
Darrel Ellis

County Prosecuting Attorney
Greg Zempel

County Sheriff
Gene Dana
Perry Huston (R)

County Treasurer
Amy Mills

Public Utility District Position 2
John Hanson

Klickitat County

Lewis County
County Assessor
Dianne Dorey (R)

County Auditor
Gary E. Zandell (R)

County Clerk
A. Kathy Brack (R)

County Commissioner District 3
Dennis Hadaller (R)

County Coroner
Terry L. Wilson (R)

County Prosecutor
Jeremy Randolph (R)

County Sheriff
Steve Mansfield (R) (appointed 1/26/05)

County Treasurer
Rose Bowman (R)

District Court Dept #1
Michael P. Roewe (NP)

District Court Dept #2
R.W. Buzzard (NP)

Lincoln County

Mason County
Mason County Commissioner District 3
Jayni Kamin (R)

Mason County Assessor
Dixie Smith (D)

Mason County Auditor
Al Brotche (D)

Mason County Clerk
Pat Swartos (D)

Mason County Coroner
Wes Stockwell (D)

Mason County Prosecutor
Gary Burleson (R)

Mason County Sheriff
Steve Whybark (D)

Mason County Treasurer
Elisabeth (Lisa) Frazier (D)

Mason County PUD No. 1
Johnny "Jack" Janda

Mason County PUD No. 3
Bruce E. Jorgenson

Okanogan County
Okanogan County Commissioner District #3
Mary Lou Peterson

Okanogan County Auditor
Peggy Robbins

Okanogan County Assessor
Scott D. Furman

Okanogan County Treasurer
Delmer L. Shove

Okanogan County Clerk
Jackie Bradley  http://www.wenatcheeworld.com/news/2012/apr/16/longtime-okanogan-clerk-killed-in-wreck/

Okanogan County Prosecuting Attorney
Kark F. Sloan

Okanogan County Sheriff
Frank Rogers

Okanogan County District Judge Position 1
Chris Culp

Okanogan County District Judge Position 2
Dave Edwards

Pacific County

Pend Oreille County

Pierce County
Pierce County Auditor
Pat McCarthy (D)

Pierce County Prosecuting Attorney
Gerald Horne (D)

Pierce County Council District 1
Shawn Bunney (R)

Pierce County Council District 5
Barbra Gelman (D)

Pierce County Council District 7
Terry Lee (R)

San Juan County
San Juan County Commissioner District 6
Robert O. Myhr

San Juan County Assessor
Paul G. Dossett (R)

San Juan County Auditor
Si A. Stephens (R)

San Juan County Clerk
Mary Jean Cahail (D)

San Juan County District Court Judge
Stewart Andrew (NP)

San Juan County Prosecuting Attorney
Randall K. Gaylord (D)

San Juan County Sheriff
Bill Cumming (D)

San Juan County Treasurer
Kathy Turnbull (R)

Skagit County

There may be a November 2006 special ballot by the Skagit County Commissioners to adopt a fluoridation ordinance that would allow and require the Skagit Public Utility District #1 to adjust the natural level of fluoride in its water supply so that a greater number of Skagit County residents can receive the proven benefits of fluoride, and thereby oral disease may be reduced. For more information read: Citizens for a Healthy Skagit or Skagit County Clean Water

Skagit County Commissioner District 3
Ted W. Anderson (R)
Sharon Dillon   (D)
Website: Sharon Dillon 

Skagit County Assessor
Mark Leander (R)

Skagit County Auditor
Norma Brummett (R)

Skagit County Clerk
Nancy Scott (D)

Skagit County Coroner
Bruce Bacon (D)

Skagit County Prosecutor
Tom Seguine (R)
Jennifer Bouwens (R)
Website: http://www.electjenbouwens.com

Skagit County Sheriff
Rick Grimstead (D)

Skagit County Treasurer
Katie Jungquist

Skagit County District Court Judge Position 1
Stephen Skelton (NP)

Skagit County District Court Judge Position 2
David Svaren (NP)

Skagit County Public Utility District Commissioner District 2
Robbie Robertson (NP)

Skamania County

Snohomish County

Spokane County

(See also Spokane County Auditor's candidate filing page and primary results page)

Spokane County Commissioner District 3
Phil Harris (R) - Incumbent (PRIMARY WINNER)
Bonnie Mager (D) (PRIMARY WINNER) (GENERAL ELECTION WINNER)
Bonnie has been Executive Director of Citizens for Clean Air, the Eastern Washington Coordinator for Washington Environmental Council and Director of Neighborhood Alliance of Spokane County.
Website: https://web.archive.org/web/20060813220156/http://www.votebonniemager.com/
George Orr (D)
Former Washington State Representative, U.S. Navy Veteran, Career Firefighter, former PTA President, school district Boardmember
Website: https://web.archive.org/web/20060814144827/http://www.votegeorgeorr.com/
Additional Info: https://web.archive.org/web/20060513182355/http://www.spokanedemocrats.org/index.cfm?page=hopefuls.cfm
Barbara "Barb" K. Chamberlain (D)
Director of Communications & Public Affairs at Washington State University Spokane since 1998; Friends of the Falls Board of Directors; University District Development Steering Committee; Co-chair, Citizens for Spokane Schools, 2006 successful levy campaign; former Idaho State Legislator, former Chair North Idaho College Board of Trustees
Website: https://web.archive.org/web/20110202175619/http://votebarbchamberlain.com/
Larry R. Vandervert (R)

Spokane County Auditor
Vicky M. Dalton (D) - Incumbent (GENERAL ELECTION WINNER)
Mike Volz (R)
Website: https://web.archive.org/web/20071010130036/http://votevolz.com/

Spokane County Assessor
(As of the evening of November 9, Baker led by less than 200 votes)
Ralph Baker (R) - Incumbent (PRIMARY WINNER)
Judy Personett (D) (PRIMARY WINNER)
Website:  http://www.electpersonettassessor.com
Brad Stark (R)
Currently a Spokane City Council member

Spokane County Clerk
Thomas R. Fallquist (R) - Incumbent

Spokane County Prosecuting Attorney
Steve Tucker (R) - Incumbent  (PRIMARY WINNER) (GENERAL ELECTION WINNER)
Bob Caruso (D) (PRIMARY WINNER)
Jim Reierson (D)

Spokane County Sheriff
Ozzie D. Knezovich (R) - Incumbent (appointed) (PRIMARY WINNER) (GENERAL ELECTION WINNER)
Website: http://www.ozzieforsheriff.com/
James Flavel (D) (PRIMARY WINNER)
Cal Walker (R)
Website: http://www.calwalkerforsheriff.com/

Spokane County Treasurer
Bob Wrigley (R)
D. E. "Skip" Chilberg (D) (GENERAL ELECTION WINNER)

Spokane County District Court Position 1
Vance W. Peterson - Incumbent

Spokane County District Court Position 2
Sara B. Derr - Incumbent (PRIMARY WINNER—with more than 50% of the vote, Derr will advance to the general election alone)
Website: http://www.reelectsaraderr.com/
Dan Davis
F. Dana Kelley.

Spokane County District Court Position 3
John O. Cooney (GENERAL ELECTION WINNER)
Website: https://web.archive.org/web/20080821075610/http://www.cooney4judge.com/
 Mark A. Laiminger
Senior Deputy Prosecutor, Spokane County
Website: https://web.archive.org/web/20071009043919/http://www.marklaiminger.org/

Spokane County District Court Position 4
Patti Connolly Walker - IncumbentSpokane County District Court (GENERAL ELECTION WINNER)
EDUCATION: B.A. Law & Psychology, Carleton University, 1985; J.D. Gonzaga University School of Law, cum laude, 1988.
OCCUPATION: Spokane District & Municipal Court Judge, Position 4. 
EMPLOYER: Spokane County District & Municipal Court.
LEGAL/JUDICIAL EXPERIENCE: Judge Patti Connolly Walker is the only Position 4 candidate with judicial experience. Elected in 2002 to District & Municipal Court after serving as Court Commissioner, Judge Walker was first a civil litigation attorney and criminal prosecutor for 13 years. She set up the Internet Crimes Unit, prosecuted adult entertainment cases and individuals who sexually abused children. She successfully argued constitutional cases before the Washington State Supreme Court, Court of Appeals and Federal Ninth Circuit Court of Appeals.
OPTIONAL INFORMATION: An avid hockey coach, Patti shares her love of hockey and sports with her three children ages 13, 11 and 8.
Candidate Statement: A trusted leader in our court, Judge Walker was elected Acting Presiding Judge for 2006. A community leader, she was President of multiple Lawyers Associations and served on numerous Boards. Accomplished, fair and impartial, she was instrumental in developing and implementing the comprehensive DUI court. Judge Walker is endorsed by those who closely monitor the courts including Judges & Community Leaders, the Regional Labor Council, State Patrol Troopers Association, Washington Council of Police/Sheriffs, Fraternal Order of Police, Spokane Police Guild, Spokane Sheriffs Association, Spokane Firefighters Union and Prosecutor Steve Tucker. She is rated Exceptionally Well Qualified - Washington Women Lawyers. 
Questionnaire: Received by Spokane County Bar Association   
Official web site: www.judgepattiwalker.com 
Mary C. Logan
Website: https://web.archive.org/web/20070630181633/http://www.maryloganforjudge.com/

Spokane County District Court Position 5
Gregory J. Tripp - Incumbent (GENERAL ELECTION WINNER)
Website: https://web.archive.org/web/20070929044901/http://www.judgetripp.com/
Rated exceptionally well-qualified by the Spokane County Bar Association and Washington Women Lawyers
Candidate Statement: "A District Court Judge since 1997, I am honored to serve the Spokane community, where I have lived and worked for over 30 years. As the only candidate with long term, proven experience as an attorney, prosecutor and judge, I have the support of our local legal community. Anyone who appears in court deserves to be treated with respect and courtesy. A judge should be open-minded and fair - and those who have committed crimes should be held accountable for their actions."
Endorsed by The Spokesman Review, see website for list of extensive legal community endorsements
Jeffrey Leslie

Spokane County District Court Position 6
Debra R. Hayes (PRIMARY WINNER) (GENERAL ELECTION WINNER)
Website: https://web.archive.org/web/20061208103020/http://www.debrahayesforjudge.com/
Mike Nelson (PRIMARY WINNER)
Website: http://www.willworkforjustice.com/
Harvey A. Dunham - Incumbent (appointed)
Website: http://www.retain-dunham.com
David Stevens
Deputy Spokane County Prosecutor, U.S. Navy veteran
Website: http://www.davidstevens.org/
Christine L. Carlile

Spokane County District Court Position 7
Donna Wilson - Incumbent

Spokane County District Court Position 8
Annette S. Plese - Incumbent

Spokane County District Court Position 9
Richard B. White - Incumbent

Stevens County
Stevens County Assessor
Al Taylor (R)

Stevens County Auditor
Tim Gray (D)

Stevens County Clerk
Patricia A. Chester (D)

Stevens County Commissioner District 2
Merrill J. Ott (R)

Stevens County Coroner
Patti Hancock (D)

Stevens County Prosecuting Attorney
John G. Wetle (R)

Stevens County Sheriff
Craig Thayer (D)

Stevens County Treasurer
Sue Harnasch (D)

Stevens County District Court Judge
Pamela F. Payne (NP)

Stevens County PUD Commissioner District 2
K.O. (Ken) Rosenberg

Thurston County

(Visit the Thurston County Auditor's web site for current information.)

Thurston County Conservation District Supervisor Position 2
David L. Hall

Thurston County PUD Commissioner District 1
Paul J. Pickett (NP)
Bud Kerr (NP)

Thurston County Commissioner District 3
Kevin O'Sullivan (R)
Bob Macleod (D)

Thurston County Assessor
Patricia Costello (D)
Tom Crowson (R)

Thurston County Auditor
Kim Wyman (R)

Thurston County Clerk
Betty J. Gould (D)

Thurston County Coroner
Terry Harper (R)
Gary Warnock (D)

Thurston County Prosecuting Attorney
Ed Holm (D)

Thurston County Sheriff
Howard Thronson (R)
Dan Kimball (D)

Thurston County Superior Court Judge Position 8
Anne Hirsch (NP)
Jim Powers (NP)

Thurston County District Judge Position 1
Susan A. Dubuisson

Thurston County District Judge Position 2
CL (Kip) Stilz

Chambers Lake Drainage District No. 3 Position 2
John Livingston

Hopkins Drainage District No. 2 Position 2
Chuck Cline

Scott Lake Drainage District No. 11 Position 3
Paul Eddy

Zenker Valley Drainage District No. 7 Position 3
Vacant

Wahkiakum County

Walla Walla County

Whatcom County

Whatcom County Council District 1
L. Ward Nelson (NP)

Whitman County

Yakima County
Yakima County Commissioner Position 3
Jesse Palacios (R)

Yakima County Assessor
Dave Cook (R)

Yakima County Auditor
Corky Mattingly (D)

Yakima County Clerk
Kim Eaton (R)

Yakima County Coroner
Maurice Rice (R)

Yakima County Prosecuting Attorney
Ron Zirkle (R)

Yakima County Sheriff
Ken Irwin (R)

Yakima County Treasurer
Ilene Thompson (R)

Yakima County District Court Position 1
Kevin Roy

Yakima County District Court Position 2
Rod Fitch

Yakima County District Court Position 3
Donald W. Engel

Yakima County District Court Position 4
Michael McCarthy

Yakima County Educational Service District #105 Director Position 2
Maggie Perez

Yakima County Educational Service District #105 Director Position 4
Patsy Callaghan

Yakima County Educational Service District #105 Director Position 6
Bruce Ricks

Judicial races

Court of Appeals Division I, District 1, Position 4
(King County)
Ronald E. Cox - Incumbent

Court of Appeals Division I, District 1, Position 7
(King County)
Marlin J Appelwick - Incumbent

Court of Appeals Division I, District 3, Position 1
(Island, San Juan, Skagit, and Whatcom Counties)
Mary Kay Becker - Incumbent
Jeff Teichert

Court of Appeals Division II, District 1, Position 3
(Pierce County)
Christine Quinn-Brintnall - Incumbent
Beth Jensen

Court of Appeals Division II, District 2, Position 2
(Clallam, Grays Harbor, Jefferson, Kitsap, Mason, and Thurston Counties)
David H. Armstrong - Incumbent

Court of Appeals Division II, District 3, Position 1
(Clark, Cowlitz, Lewis, Pacific, Skamania, and Wahkiakum Counties)
Joel Penoyar - Incumbent (ELECTION WINNER, His name was the only name on the ballot for the position in the general election.)
Brent Boger

Court of Appeals Division III, District 1, Position 1
(Ferry, Lincoln, Okanogan, Pend Oreille, Spokane, and Stevens Counties)
John A. Schultheis - Incumbent

Court of Appeals Division III, District 3, Position 2
(Chelan, Douglas, Kittitas, Klickitat, and Yakima Counties)
Teresa C. Kulik - Incumbent

External links
Public Disclosure Commission candidate search

Local